Ernst Denifl (born 4 January 1962) is an Austrian former cyclist. He competed in the men's cross-country mountain biking event at the 1996 Summer Olympics.

References

External links
 

1962 births
Living people
Austrian male cyclists
Olympic cyclists of Austria
Cyclists at the 1996 Summer Olympics
People from Hall in Tirol
Sportspeople from Tyrol (state)
20th-century Austrian people
21st-century Austrian people